José María Sarasol Soler (El Genovés 1970), Sarasol II, is a Valencian pilota professional player. His brother Enric was Sarasol I. He has been member of the Valencian Pilota Squad for 11 years and has deserved to be awarded as the Best Player at the Argentina'02 Handball International Championships.

Sarasol II keeps playing for the ValNet company.

Trophies 
 Winner of the Campionat Nacional d'Escala i Corda 1987 and 1992
 Runner-up Campionat Nacional d'Escala i Corda 1990
 Winner of the Circuit Bancaixa 1992, 1998 and 1999
 Runner-up of the Circuit Bancaixa 1993, 2001, 2004, 2005 and 2007

Handball International Championships
 Winner of the 5 Nations Llargues Championship, València 1993
 Runner-up of the European Llargues Championship, France 1994
 Winner of the European Llargues Championship, Imperia (Italy) 1999
 Winner of the World Llargues Championship, València 1996
 Winner of the World Llargues Championship, Maubeuge (France) 1998
 Winner of the World Llargues Championship, València 2000
 Winner of the European Frontó and International game Championship, Netherlands 2001
 Runner-up of the European Llargues Championship, Netherlands 2001
 Winner of the World Llargues, Frontó and International game Championship, Argentina 2002

References

1970 births
Living people
People from Costera
Sportspeople from the Province of Valencia
Pilotaris from the Valencian Community